(Pāli; ;) means "recollection," "contemplation," "remembrance," "meditation", and "mindfulness". It refers to specific Buddhist meditational or devotional practices, such as recollecting the sublime qualities of the Buddha, which lead to mental tranquillity and abiding joy. In various contexts, the Pali literature and Sanskrit Mahayana sutras emphasise and identify different enumerations of recollections.

 may also refer to meditative attainments, such as the ability to recollect past lives, also called causal memory.

Grouping

Three recollections 

The three recollections:
 Recollection of the Buddha
 Recollection of the Dhamma (Pi. ; Skt. ; Tib.  )
 Recollection of the Sangha (Pi. ; Skt. ; Tib.  )

The Dhammapada (Verse 296, 297 & 298) declares that the Buddha's disciples who constantly practice recollection of the Triple Gem "ever awaken happily". According to the Theragatha, such a practice will lead to "the height of continual joy".

Unlike other subjects of meditative recollection mentioned in this article, the Triple Gem are considered "devotional contemplations". The Triple Gem are listed as the first three subjects of recollection for each of the following lists as well.

Five recollections 

On  days, in addition to practicing the Eight Precepts, the Buddha enjoined a disciple to engage in one or more of five recollections:
 Recollection of the Buddha
 Recollection of the Dhamma
 Recollection of the Sangha
 Recollection of virtues (Pi. ; Tib.  )
 Recollection of the devas (Pi. ; Tib.  )

According to the Buddha, for one who practices such recollections: "his mind is calmed, and joy arises; the defilements of his mind are abandoned".

Six recollections 

The six recollections are:
 Recollection of the Buddha
 Recollection of the Dhamma
 Recollection of the Sangha
 Recollection of generosity (Pi. ; Tib.  )
 Recollection of virtues
 Recollection of the devas 

The Buddha tells a disciple that the mind of one who practices these recollections "is not overcome with passion, not overcome with aversion, not overcome with delusion. His mind heads straight, ... gains joy connected with the Dhamma..., rapture arises..., the body grows calm ... experiences ease..., the mind becomes concentrated".

In Mahayana Buddhist practices, the first six recollections were commonly taught and the Buddha  was particularly emphasised in many popular sutras such as the Medicine Buddha sutra.

Ten recollections 

As ten recollections, the following are added to the previous six recollections:
 Recollection of death or mindfulness of death
 Mindfulness of the breath
 Mindfulness of the body
 Recollection of peace

Although the Pali canon refers to mindfulness of death, the Visuddhimagga refers to the recollection of death.

In terms of the development of meditative absorption, mindfulness of the breath can lead to all four s, mindfulness of the body can lead only to the first , while the eight other recollections culminate in pre-jhanic "access concentration".

The recollection of death is connected with the Buddhist concept of non-self: devotees recollect on the inevitability of their own demise, and in that way learn to understand that their physical body is not a permanent self. To often reflect in such a way, is believed to strongly affect the devotee's motivations and priorities in life, and to help the devotee become more realistic.

Recollections

Recollection of the Buddha (Buddhanussati) 

The Aṅguttara Nikāya provides the following verse for the recollection the Buddha:

It has been suggested that the recollection of the Buddha identified in the Theravādin's Pāli Canon might have been the basis for the more elaborately visual contemplations typical of Tibetan Buddhism.

Recollection of the Dhamma (Dhammanusati) 

The Aṅguttara Nikāya provides the following verse for the recollection of the :

The Teaching of the Buddha has six supreme qualities:

  ("well-expounded, well-proclaimed, or self-announced"). The Buddha's teaching is not a speculative philosophy but an exposition of the Universal Law of Nature based on a causal analysis of natural phenomena. It is taught, therefore, as a science rather than a sectarian belief system. Full comprehension (enlightenment) of the teaching may take varying lengths of time but Buddhists traditionally say that the course of study is 'excellent in the beginning ("moral principles"), excellent in the middle ("concentration") and excellent in the end' ("wisdom").
  ("able to be examined"). The  is open to scientific and other types of scrutiny and is not based on faith. It can be tested by personal practice and one who follows it will see the result for oneself by means of one's own experience.  comes from the word  which means "visible in this world" and is derived from the word .
  ("timeless, immediate"). The  is able to bestow timeless and immediate results here and now. There is no need to wait for the future or a next existence. The  does not change over time and it is not relative to time.
  ("which you can come and see" — from the phrase , "come, see!"). The Dhamma invites all beings to put it to the test and come see for themselves.
  ("leading one close to"). Followed as a part of one's life the dhamma leads one to liberation. In the "Vishuddhimagga" this is also referred to as "Upanayanam."  means "to be brought inside oneself". This can be understood with an analogy as follows. If one says a ripe mango tastes delicious, and if several people listen and come to believe it, they would imagine the taste of the mango according to their previous experiences of other delicious mangoes. Yet, they will still not really know exactly how this mango tastes. Also, if there is a person who has never tasted a ripe mango before, that person has no way of knowing exactly for himself how it tastes. So, the only way to know the exact taste is to experience it. In the same way,  is said to be  which means that a person needs to experience it within to see exactly what it is.
  ("to be meant to perceive directly"). The  is "to be realised by the wise for themselves". It can be perfectly realised only by the noble disciples who have matured in supreme wisdom. No one can "enlighten" another person. Each intelligent person has to attain and experience for themselves. As an analogy, no one can simply make another know how to swim. Each person individually has to learn how to swim. In the same way, dhamma cannot be transferred or bestowed upon someone. Each one has to know for themselves.

Therefore, each person is fully responsible for his or her self to put it into practice for real.

However efficient the doctor or wonderful the medicine may be, the patients cannot be cured unless they take the medicine properly.

These teachings ranged from understanding  and developing good impressions in one's mind, to reach full enlightenment by recognising the nature of mind.

Recollection of the Sangha (Sanghanusati) 

The Aṅguttara Nikāya provides the following verses for the recollection of the Sangha:

Practicing masterfully, or practicing with integrity, means sharing what they have learned with others.

Recollection of virtues (Silanussati) 

The Aṅguttara Nikāya provides the following verse for the recollection of virtues:

Recollection of generosity (Caganussati) 

The Aṅguttara Nikāya provides the following verse for the recollection of generosity:

Recollection of devas (Devatanussati) 

The Aṅguttara Nikāya provides the following verses for the recollection of the devas:

See also

Notes

References

Bibliography 

 
 
 
 
 
 
  .
 
 
 

External links 
 The Ten Recollections: A Study Guide, by Thanissaro Bhikkhu (1999).

Buddhist meditation
Mindfulness (Buddhism)
Pali words and phrases